Howard Peter Ruetz (August 18, 1927June 2, 1999) was a professional American football defensive tackle in the National Football League.  

Born and raised in Racine, WI, he was the son of George "Babe" Ruetz, coach of the Racine Legion. He attended Racine St. Catherine's High School, graduating in 1947. He played at the collegiate level at Loras College, graduating in 1951, and the Green Bay Packers (1951–1953). He is a member of the Loras College 1947 Hall of Fame football team and the Racine County Sports Hall of Fame (2017).

See also
Green Bay Packers players
Los Angeles Rams

References

1927 births
1999 deaths
American football defensive tackles
Green Bay Packers players
Loras Duhawks football players
Sportspeople from Racine, Wisconsin
Players of American football from Wisconsin
Sportspeople from the Milwaukee metropolitan area